"Perfect" is a song by English singer Anne-Marie from her 2018 album Speak Your Mind. It was remixed and retitled "Perfect to Me" when released as a single on 2 November 2018. Scoop.co.nz reported the release of the song in mid-October, before Anne-Marie officially announced it on 31 October.

Critical reception
News.com.au called the track "body positive" and said Anne-Marie had been striking a "resounding chord" with tracks like "Perfect". GQ reviewed Anne-Marie's live performance of the song at a Rough Trade store in Brooklyn, saying "she begins shouting her insecurities to the audience: about wanting longer legs, never fitting in, and eating copious amounts of dessert. Then she does the unthinkable. She grabs and pinches her own body fat onstage", going on to say she knows how to "put on a show".

Promotion
Anne-Marie announced the release of the track on 31 October, and performed the new version for the first time live in the studio on BBC Radio 2 on 31 October 2018.

Charts

Certifications

References

2018 songs
2018 singles
Anne-Marie (singer) songs
Songs written by Jennifer Decilveo
Songs written by Anne-Marie (singer)